Harry S. Sidhu (born July 8, 1957) is an American Republican politician and businessman who served as the 46th mayor of Anaheim, California, winning the office in the 2018 election. He was the first person of color and the first Sikh to serve as mayor of Anaheim. He is a former member of the Anaheim City Council and the former Mayor pro tempore of Anaheim.

In May 2022, a court filing revealed that he is under investigation by the FBI for possible corruption involving the sale of Angel Stadium, and the Anaheim City Council unanimously requested that he resign his position as mayor. On May 23, 2022, Sidhu resigned as mayor, effective the following day.

Education and early career 
Sidhu earned a degree in mechanical engineering from Drexel University. He became a U.S. citizen in 1979 and worked as a consulting engineer.

Sidhu served as director of the Orange County Water District Board. He also serves on the board of Friends of United States, an organization that promotes India–United States relations.

Mayoral career 

Per an affidavit by FBI Special Agent Brian Adkins, Sidhu is under investigation for having violated numerous federal statutes. These potential violations include: honest services fraud, theft or bribery concerning programs receiving federal funds, wire fraud, mail fraud, false statements, obstruction of justice, and witness tampering. The release of this information prompted the State of California Attorney General Rob Bonta to suspend a pending settlement with the City of Anaheim regarding the Angel Stadium sale.

On May 16, 2022, a court filing by the California Superior Court, County of Orange, stated that Sidhu is under investigation by the FBI and an Orange County Grand Jury for potential criminal conduct related to the sale of the Angel Stadium property, and for his actions related to the registering of a personal aircraft at a false out-of-state address. The sale of Angel Stadium and its land for $320 million to the Anaheim Angels is alleged to have violated state law, specifically the Surplus Land Act, which requires public agencies to prioritize affordable housing, parks, and open space when they sell public property. Furthermore, it is alleged that he provided confidential information to the Angels, and hoped to solicit $1 million in campaign contributions from the team.

Electoral history

City Council

Mayor

References

External links 
 Official mayoral website
 Campaign website

1957 births
21st-century American politicians
American politicians of Indian descent
American mayors of Indian descent
California politicians of Indian descent
American businesspeople
American engineers
American Sikhs
California city council members
California Republicans
Drexel University alumni
Living people
Mayors of Anaheim, California
Indian emigrants to the United States
Asian conservatism in the United States